Dagmar Ingrid Braun Celeste (née Braun; born November 23, 1941) is an American counselor, and author. The former first lady of Ohio, she was married to former Ohio governor (1983–1991) and U.S. ambassador Richard F. Celeste, whom she met while attending Oxford University in England.  They have six grown children, and were divorced in 1995.

Early life and education

Celeste was born in Krems, Lower Austria, Nazi occupied Austria. She holds a Bachelor of Arts degree in women's studies, a public policy law degree from Capital University, and a master's degree in alcoholism and drug abuse ministry from the Methodist Theological School in Ohio. She is also a licensed polarity practitioner.

Politics and social issues

Some notable achievements as first lady of Ohio included chairing the Ohio Recovery Council, spearheading the drive to establish the first state-sponsored on-site child care center and Employee Assistance Program in Ohio, initiating the Task Force on Family Violence, co-chairing the Governor's Commission on Volunteerism, and serving as co-chair of the Council on Holocaust Education. She was an Ohio delegate to the Democratic Convention in 1980. Since 1992, she has continued to remain politically active through such organizations as the National Peace Institute, Women's Action for Nuclear Disarmament, the Council for Ethics in Economics, and the Women's Community Fund in Cleveland.

Ordination

In 2002, Celeste announced that she had secretly been ordained a priest of the Roman Catholic Church under the pseudonym of "Angela White". She was one of seven women, the "Danube Seven", ordained by Argentinian independent Catholic bishop Rómulo Antonio Braschi on a boat on the Danube River, making her the first female American Roman Catholic to call herself a priest. Celeste was subsequently excommunicated by the Roman Catholic Church, which does not recognize the validity of the ordination of women.

Other activities

Celeste serves as the executive director of the Tyrian network, "an intentional learning community founded in 2000 on Kelleys Island, Ohio and dedicated to Brigid, both the Goddess and the Saint". She is the author of the auto-biographical book We Can Do Together: Impressions of a Recovering Feminist First Lady. She has also participated in productions of The Vagina Monologues. She is a long-standing professional Life Balance coach who developed an individualized three-month coaching process designed to empower one to discover a life worth living by embracing the life one is truly called to.

Bibliography

 2002 - We Can Do Together: Impressions of a Recovering Feminist First Lady (Kent State University Press)

References

Other sources:
 Women Find a Way: the Movement and Stories of Roman Catholic WomenPriests; edited by Elsie Hainz McGrath, Bridget Mary Meehan & Ida Raming; 
 Making Waves, a play / oral history project by Kay Eaton and Cece Miller of Sacred Space in Cleveland, OH, includes a reading of the career of Dagmar Celeste

External links

 Roman Catholic Womenpriests
 Ladybug Enterprises
 Tyrian Network Website
 KSU Library: Media & Public Relations Data

1942 births
American non-fiction writers
Austrian emigrants to the United States
Austrian Roman Catholics
American Roman Catholics
Capital University alumni
Alumni of the University of Oxford
Christian feminist theologians
First Ladies and Gentlemen of Ohio
Living people
Methodist Theological School in Ohio alumni
People excommunicated by the Catholic Church
People from Krems an der Donau